I Am You may refer to:

 In Her Skin, a 2009 drama film known as I Am You from the working title How to Change in 9 Weeks
 I Am You (mixtape), a 2018 mixtape by YNW Melly
 I Am You (EP), a 2018 extended play by Stray Kids
 "I Am You", the EP's title track

See also
 I Am Yours (disambiguation)
 You Am I (disambiguation)